Vimukthi is both a given name and a surname. Notable people with the name include:

Nalin Vimukthi (born 1988), Sri Lankan cricketer
Vimukthi Jayasundara, Sri Lankan film director
Vimukthi Perera (born 1989), Sri Lankan cricketer

Media
 Vimukthi (film), a 2008 Kannada film directed by P. Sheshadri

Literature
Vimukthi, Sanskrit term loosely meaning "liberation;" used in Buddhism, Hinduism, and Jainism

See also
Janatha Vimukthi Peramuna, Sri Lankan Communist political party

Sinhalese surnames
Sinhalese masculine given names